Vicente "Vince" d'Avila Melo Brun (born April 14, 1947) is a Brazilian-American Olympic sailor and sail maker that competed in the Soling class at the 1976 and 1980 Summer Olympics. 1976, he finished 10th together with his brother Gastão Brun and Andreas Wengert, and in 1980 he finished 6th together with his brother and Roberto Luiz Souza. He also won three Soling World Championships (1978, 1981, 1983) and the 1986 Star World Championships and participated in the Stars & Stripes America's Cup campaign. Brun moved to the United States in 1975.

Brun was inducted into the National Sailing Hall of Fame in 2018.

References

1947 births
Living people
Brazilian male sailors (sport)
Brazilian people of German descent
North American Champions Soling
Olympic sailors of Brazil
Sailors at the 1976 Summer Olympics – Soling
Sailors at the 1980 Summer Olympics – Soling
Star class world champions
World champions in sailing for Brazil
Soling class world champions